Many books and other works of fiction are set in, or refer to, fictional British or Irish universities. This list includes identifiable fictional universities or other institutions appearing to offer degree-level qualifications, and which are located in Britain or Ireland or, in a few cases, are extra-terrestrial institutions with clear British or Irish connections. Individual Oxbridge colleges are not included as there are separate lists of these.

Note that the red brick university in which Kingsley Amis sets Lucky Jim is unnamed.

References

See also
List of fictional Cambridge colleges
List of fictional Oxbridge colleges
List of fictional Oxford colleges
Campus novel
 

Fictional
Fictional
British and Irish universities